Hessemilimax kotulae is a species of air-breathing land snail in the family Vitrinidae.

Distribution 
This species occurs in:
 Czech Republic
 Ukraine

References

Vitrinidae
Gastropods described in 1883